The North Wisconsin Lumber Company Office is a historic building in Hayward, Wisconsin. The office was built in 1889 by the North Wisconsin Lumber Company, a prominent logging company in Wisconsin's Namekagon region which was founded by A.J. Hayward and R.L. McCormick. The building's design includes cast iron columns in its storefront, tall windows with arched lintels, and brick corbels and dentils.

The office was added to the National Register of Historic Places on May 7, 1980.

Gallery

References

Commercial buildings on the National Register of Historic Places in Wisconsin
Commercial buildings completed in 1889
Buildings and structures in Sawyer County, Wisconsin
National Register of Historic Places in Sawyer County, Wisconsin